Rileyonymus is a genus of minute seed weevils in the beetle family Curculionidae. There is one described species in Rileyonymus, R. relictus.

References

Further reading

 
 
 

Ceutorhynchini
Articles created by Qbugbot